Podocarpus affinis is a species of conifer in the family Podocarpaceae. It is endemic to Fiji, where it is known only from high mountain ridges on the island of Viti Levu.

References

affinis
Endemic flora of Fiji
Taxonomy articles created by Polbot